"Ridin'" is a song recorded by South Korean boy group NCT Dream for their fourth extended play Reload (2020). The song was released by SM Entertainment on April 29, 2020, as the album's lead single.

Composition 
The song was written by Jam Factory's Jang Jeong-won and Rick Bridges and produced by Moonshine, Maurice Moore, Jeremy “Tay” Jasper, Adrian Mckinnon, Darius Martin and Hautboi Rich.

Commercial performance 
"Ridin'" debuted at number 25 on the Gaon Digital Chart for the week ending May 2, 2020. The song placed at number 3 on the componing Download chart and at number 87 on the Streaming chart. In its second week, the song achieved a new peak at number 17 on the Gaon Digital Chart, placing at number 4 on the Download Chart and also achieving a new peak at number 45 on the Streaming Chart, making it the group's highest-charting song to date.

It also debuted at number 19 on the US World Digital Song Sales chart, marking the group's ninth entry. In its second week, the song achieved a new peak at number 18.

Charts

Accolades

References 

2020 singles
2020 songs
NCT Dream songs
SM Entertainment singles